Badozhsky Pogost is a rural locality (a village) in Annenskoye Rural Settlement, Vytegorsky District, Vologda Oblast, Russia. The population was 73 as of 2002.

Geography 
Badozhsky Pogost is located 68 km southeast of Vytegra (the district's administrative centre) by road. Veliky Dvor is the nearest rural locality.

References 

Rural localities in Vytegorsky District